Gerald Henry Blake is a retired British academic and geographer. He is Professor Emeritus of Geography at Durham University. He was Principal of Collingwood College, Durham from 1987 to 2001.

He attended Monkton Combe School from 1949 to 1954. A former student of St Edmund Hall, Oxford, Blake was appointed Professor of Geography in 1995.

Publications

References

Year of birth missing (living people)
People educated at Monkton Combe School
Living people
British geographers
Academics of Durham University
Alumni of St Edmund Hall, Oxford